The 1993 J. League Cup, officially the '93 J.League Yamazaki Nabisco Cup, was the 19th edition of Japan soccer league cup tournament and the second edition under the current J. League Cup format. The championship started on September 10 and finished on November 23, 1993.

Group stage

Group A

Group B

Knockout phase

Final

References
Official report 

1993 domestic association football cups
1993
Lea